The 1932 St Marylebone by-election was held on 28 April 1932.  The by-election was held due to the succession to the peerage of the incumbent Conservative MP, Rennell Rodd.  It was won by the Conservative candidate Alec Cunningham-Reid.

References

St Marylebone by-election
St Marylebone,1932
St Marylebone by-election
St Marylebone,1932